Gyrinus is a genus of small aquatic whirligig beetles in the family Gyrinidae native to the Palearctic (including Europe), the Near East, the Nearctic, North Africa, Asia and Australia.

Species
These species belong to the genus Gyrinus:

References

External links

Gyrinus at Fauna Europaea

Gyrinidae
Adephaga genera
Taxa named by Étienne Louis Geoffroy